Fetion (Chinese:飞信, pinyin: fēi xìn, lit. flying letter) was an instant messaging (IM) client developed by China Mobile, a Chinese telecommunications company. It allows users to send and receive SMS free of charge between PCs and mobile phones (in certain conditions). China Mobile  to develop Fetion into a comprehensive communications service which will focus on wireless communications and offer the Internet applications as a complement. D-media Communication Tech (a subsidiary company of Ultrapower Software Co., Ltd) undertakes construction, operation and maintain of Fetion.

History 
Shenzhou Taiyue was originally the only supplier of the outsourcing development, operation and support for Fetion. However, every time the company attempted to renew its contract with China Mobile, it was hit with rumours of insider trading, contract terminations and unstable performance resulting in sharp fluctuations in its share price. China Mobile subsequently put four sub-projects out to tender and Shenzhou Taiyue lost its monopoly.

Usage 
Rumoured  to have been called "Femoo" before launch, the product was renamed "Fetion", since in Chinese "Femoo" sounds like the word for "tomb" and has negative connotations. In 2012 the service had around 90 million active users and income of around 300 million renminbi. Providers of over-the-top content (OTT) have complained that Fetion has failed to address the fee structure changes required to counter competition from other services including WeChat.

See also 

 Comparison of cross-platform instant messaging clients
Comparison of instant messaging protocols
Comparison of Internet Relay Chat clients
Comparison of LAN messengers
Comparison of VoIP software
List of SIP software
List of video telecommunication services and product brands

References

External links 
Official Site
China Mobile Begins Fetion Commercial Service - ChinaTechNews.com
SMS Sender Using Fetion ( PHP Script ) 
PHP Fetion on Google Code
Fetion protocol plugin for Pidgin, a cross-platform free software IM client

Instant messaging clients
China Mobile
VoIP software